Enyo Glacier is a south-flowing glacier  long situated east of Sandy Glacier in the eastern part of the Olympus Range, in the McMurdo Dry Valleys of Antarctica. In association with the names from Greek mythology grouped in this area, it was named by the New Zealand Geographic Board in 1998 after Enyo, a goddess of war.

See also 
Wrenn Peak

References 

Glaciers of Victoria Land
Scott Coast